The Artistic Infusion Program (AIP) is a program of the United States Mint, established in 2003, which invites American artists to create designs for U.S. coins and medals, most notably the 50 State, DC and US Territories, and America the Beautiful quarters. The goal of the AIP is to enrich and diversify the design of United States coins and medals by contracting a collection of artists with varying artistic skills and talents.

Coin designs 

 Lincoln Union Shield cent, reverse only
 50 State quarters, reverse only
 District of Columbia and United States Territories quarters, reverse only
 Native American dollars, reverse only
 American Innovation dollars, both obverse and reverse
 American Platinum Eagle, proof reverse only
 Most Modern United States commemorative coins

References

External links
U.S. Mint press release
Deadline Nears for Artists to Apply to Design Nation’s Coins

United States Mint